Gerhard VI may refer to:

 Gerhard VI of Jülich, Count of Berg and Ravensberg (c. 1325 – 1360)
 Gerhard VI, Count of Holstein (~1367–1404)
 Gerhard VI, Count of Oldenburg (1430–1500)